Plain Truth is a 2004 TV drama directed by Paul Shapiro, starring Mariska Hargitay, Alison Pill and Jan Niklas. The film is based on Jodi Picoult's book Plain Truth, where an Amish teen hides a pregnancy, gives birth in secret, and then flatly denies it all when the baby's body is found, urban defense attorney Ellie Harrison decides to defend her.

Plot summary

Katie (Alison Pill) is an 18-year-old girl who lives in a small Amish community in the Pennsylvania farm country. When a newborn baby is found dead, police suspect foul play, and Katie is accused of having given birth to the child, then taking its life due to her shame about the baby's illegitimacy. Katie protests her innocence on both charges, and Ellie Harrison  (Mariska Hargitay), a tough and well-respected attorney, is brought in to defend her in court.  Eventually it is revealed that Katie had conceived the child by a young male academic student whom she had befriended while attending college to visit her excommunicated 
brother. She was wearing nice non-amish clothes while visiting her brother. Her child had been born extremely sickly due to Katie's lifetime practice of drinking unpasteurized milk.  It is assumed by the jury and the townspeople in general, therefore, that the baby merely died naturally of its weakened condition shortly after birth, and so Katie is declared innocent of all wrongdoing.  At the very end of the story, however, Katie's mother Sarah privately reveals to Ellie that she had known that Katie was pregnant and that she followed her to the pond the night that Katie went there and gave birth.  Sarah shows Ellie the scissors that had been missing from her husband's barn since that night. The implication is that she used the scissors to cut the umbilical cord, that she suffocated the baby and disposed of the body in the pond. Though shocked and horrified at the gaunt older woman's admission, Ellie chooses not to reveal her knowledge to the police.  The classic Picoult twist is that after all Ellie had been through trying to get the truth out of Katie, it seems as though Katie had been covering for her mother's murder of the baby all along.

Cast
 Mariska Hargitay as Ellie Harrison
 Alison Pill as Katie Fitch
 Jan Niklas as Aaron Fitch
 Kate Trotter as Sarah Fitch
 Alec McClure as Jacob Fitch
 Robert Bockstael as George Calloway
 Colin Fox as Bishop Stoflus
 Jonathan LaPaglia as Cooper
 Laura Leigh Hughes as Det. Lisa Munro
 Catherine Disher as Leda
 Andrew Martin-Smith as Samuel Stoflus
 Christopher Ralph as Adam Sinclair
 Jeremy Akerman as Judge
 Mauralea Austin as Jury foreman
 Nigel Bennett as Jeremy Whitmore

References

External links 
 
 
 

2004 television films
2004 films
Amish in popular culture
Amish in films
Lifetime (TV network) films
Films based on works by Jodi Picoult
2000s English-language films